Mirovice is a town in Písek District in the South Bohemian Region of the Czech Republic. It has about 1,600 inhabitants. The town centre is well preserved and is protected by law as an urban monument zone.

Administrative parts
Villages of Boješice, Kakovice, Ohař, Plíškovice, Ráztely, Řeteč, Sochovice and Touškov are administrative parts of Mirovice.

Geography
It lies in the Benešov Uplands. The Skalice River flows through the town.

History
The first written mention of Mirovice is from 1323. The oldest part of Mirovice is Ráztely, mentioned already in 1088.

Sights

The main landmark is the Church of Saint Clement. It was probably built around 1240. In 1726, it was rebuilt into the Baroque style by plans of Kilian Ignaz Dientzenhofer.

The Marian column on the square is from 1717.

Twin towns – sister cities

Mirovice is twinned with:
 Bätterkinden, Switzerland

References

External links

Cities and towns in the Czech Republic
Populated places in Písek District
Prácheňsko